Mark Coulson (born 11 February 1986) is an English footballer who plays for  side St Ives Town, where he plays as a defender.

Playing career

Peterborough United
Coulson made his Football League debut for Peterborough United in the 5–0 defeat at Tranmere Rovers on 18 March 2005 replacing Ahmed Deen as a substitute.

He made eight league appearances for Peterborough, before signing for Histon in 2007. Later in the year he moved on to Hemel Hempstead Town. In 2009, he signed for Biggleswade Town.

Bury Town
In July 2010, Mark moved to Bury Town.

St Ives Town
Coulson signed for Southern League Premier Division Central side St Ives Town for the 2018–19 season.

References

External links

1986 births
Living people
People from Huntingdon
English footballers
Association football defenders
Peterborough United F.C. players
Histon F.C. players
Hemel Hempstead Town F.C. players
Biggleswade Town F.C. players
Bury Town F.C. players
St Ives Town F.C. players
Cambridge City F.C. players
English Football League players